Oligodon erythrogaster, the Nagarkot kukri snake, is a species of snake found in India and Nepal.

References

 Boulenger, G.A. 1907 Rec. Ind. Mus. i: 216

erythrogaster
Reptiles described in 1907